The Hakenberg Victory Column is a 36-metre tall monument with an observation deck at Hakenberg near Fehrbellin in Brandenburg, Germany.

It was designed by Christian Daniel Rauch and built between 1875 and 1879. It commemorates the victory of Frederick William, Elector of Brandenburg, over the troops of occupying Sweden in the Battle of Fehrbellin (1675).

See also
List of towers

Monuments and memorials in Germany
Monumental columns in Germany
Buildings and structures in Ostprignitz-Ruppin
1879 sculptures
Terminating vistas in Germany
Towers completed in 1879
Victory monuments
Outdoor sculptures in Germany
Statues in Germany